Hard-Boiled Haggerty (aka  Hard Boiled Haggerty) is a 1927 American silent war film directed by Charles Brabin. The film stars Milton Sills and Molly O'Day, taking on two roles as both the character Germaine and her look-alike sister. Hard-Boiled Haggerty was one of the first American films to portray aerial combat in World War I.

Plot
After bringing down yet another German pilot and escaping uninjured from his burning aircraft, Haggerty (Milton Sills) and his buddy, aircraft machinist Klaxon (Arthur Stone), head for Paris, albeit without an official leave of absence. In escaping from M.P.'s, Haggerty takes refuge in a room occupied by Germaine Benoit (Molly O'Day). Love soon springs up, and Haggerty decides to reform, returning to Major Cotton (Mitchell Lewis) with this resolution. He is unprepared, however, to be awarded a medal for his actions as a fighter pilot.

Major Cotton, when introduced to Germaine at the officers' ball, recognizes her as "Go-Go" (Molly O'Day), a notorious cabaret dancer, and tries to tell Haggerty who she really is. Haggerty angrily knocks him down, and they are both arrested. At the trial, the major tells his story and Germaine confesses. After the Armistice, it develops that Go-Go is actually Germaine's sister, and that Germaine was trying to protect her. The two lovers Germaine and Haggerty are finally reunited.

Cast

 Milton Sills as Hard-Boiled Haggerty
 Molly O'Day as Germaine Benoit / "Go-Go" Benoit
 Mitchell Lewis as Major Cotton
 Arthur Stone as Klaxon, the mechanic
 George Fawcett as Brigadier-General
 Yola d'Avril as Cafe dancer

Production
Hard-Boiled Haggerty was based on a story by former World War I pilot Elliot White Springs, but was more of a romantic comedy than an aviation film. Nevertheless, a number of aircraft were used in the production: Travel Air 4000, Travel Air 4000, Fokker D.VII and Thomas Morse S-4C.

Reception
Aviation film historian James Farmer considered Hard-Boiled Haggerty, although one of the first films to depict the aerial conflicts of World War I, as light weight fare. Aviation film historian Stephen Pendo noted that more action took place on the ground than in the air.

References

Notes

Bibliography

 Farmer, James H. Celluloid Wings: The Impact of Movies on Aviation. Blue Ridge Summit, Pennsylvania: Tab Books Inc., 1984. .
 Orriss, Bruce W. When Hollywood Ruled the Skies: The Aviation Film Classics of World War I. Los Angeles: Aero Associates, 2013. .
 Paris, Michael. From the Wright Brothers to Top Gun: Aviation, Nationalism, and Popular Cinema. Manchester, UK: Manchester University Press, 1995. .
 Pendo, Stephen. Aviation in the Cinema. Lanham, Maryland: Scarecrow Press, 1985. .

External links

1927 films
1927 war films
World War I aviation films
American silent feature films
American black-and-white films
American war films
First National Pictures films
Films directed by Charles Brabin
Silent war films
1920s American films
1920s English-language films